The membership of the Church of Jesus Christ of Latter-day Saints (LDS Church) as of December 31, 2021, was 16,805,400. LDS church annual membership growth, while positive every year for 165 years, has reduced velocity during recent years and slowed to below the world growth rate during the COVID-19 pandemic. In 2020 the annual growth rate in membership was 0.6% and in 2021 annual membership growth was 0.85%, lagging the world population growth rate which was around 1.05% in 2020 and 1.00% in 2021.

Membership defined
The LDS Church defines membership as:

Growth and demographic history

The records of the LDS Church show membership growth every decade since its beginning in the 1830s, although that has slowed significantly.  Following initial growth rates that averaged 10% to 25% per year in the 1830s through 1850s, it grew at about 4% per year through the last four decades of the 19th century. After a steady slowing of growth in the first four decades of the 20th century to a rate of about 2% per year in the 1930s (the Great Depression years), growth boomed to an average of 6% per year for the decade around 1960, staying around 4% to 5% through 1990. After 1990, average annual growth again slowed steadily to a rate around 2.2% for the ten years ending 2015, approximately double the average world population growth rate of 1.1% for the same period. The growth rate has not been greater than 3% per year in the 21st century and has decelerated steadily since 2012. The rate has not been above 2% since 2013. In May 2019, however, Phil Zuckerman, Ph.D., of Psychology Today expressed skepticism of how the LDS Church reports growth in membership, noting that while church membership was reported to be rising, separate analysis conducted by journalist Jana Riess showed that reports of Mormon retention, religious participation, teachings and belief have been declining since 2007. By 2019, Mormons represented 51% of the population in their longtime stronghold of Utah, in contrast with 75% in 2000.

Riess made her research public in her book The Next Mormons.  Book reviewer Stephen Cranney stated in his review of The Next Mormons that the book "fill[s] the need for a large, representative Latter-day Saint sample." Cranney also stated that "Media outlets and others will occasionally perform one-off surveys that gather Latter-day Saint responses to specific (often political) issues, but generally social scientists, the media, and the public are flying in the dark when it comes to finding representative numbers about Latter-day Saint attitudes and beliefs. Furthermore, the few surveys that do have large numbers of Latter-day Saints (such as the American Religious Identification Survey or the Pew Religious Landscape Surveys) are generic religion surveys, so questions do not reflect concerns, language, or concepts specific to Latter-day Saints."

The church maintains a membership record for every person who meets the church's membership criteria and has it recorded, so verification of the exact number who belong to the church is readily obtainable by church leaders.

LDS Church membership numbers

Table for recent growth

World population numbers as of April 5, 2020.

Table for LDS Church membership numbers
Membership numbers from 1830-2011 come from the 2013 Church Almanac.

See also

The Church of Jesus Christ of Latter-day Saints
The Church of Jesus Christ of Latter-day Saints membership statistics

References

History of the Church of Jesus Christ of Latter-day Saints
Membership
Religious demographics